The BHP Newcastle 32 class were a class of diesel locomotives built by A Goninan & Co, Broadmeadow for the BHP, Newcastle steelworks between 1954 and 1956.

History
In 1954 BHP took delivery of three GE 70-ton switchers for use on its Newcastle steelworks network from A Goninan & Co, Broadmeadow with a further two delivered in 1956.

Class list

References

 Men, Steel and Rails by David Jehan 1999, Published by BHP 
 Australian Diesel Scene 5 2002, Published by Eveleigh Press 
 Specification sheet ex BHP Newcastle Steelworks diesel shop
 Steel and Rails in Newcastle, by Keith McDonald 1981, Published by Light Railway Research Society of Australia 

BHP Billiton diesel locomotives
Bo-Bo locomotives
General Electric locomotives
Diesel locomotives of New South Wales
Railway locomotives introduced in 1954
Rail transport in the Hunter Region
Standard gauge locomotives of Australia
Diesel-electric locomotives of Australia